Anadish Kumar Pal (born 1963) is an Indian inventor, poet, and environmentalist.

Biography 

He is of Bengali origin. Anadish Pal has obtained ten United States patents, a significant patent issued in 2009 for an electromagnetically controlled, fuel-efficient internal combustion engine is titled, "Relaying piston multiuse valve-less electromagnetically controlled energy conversion devices". He was granted two more patents in 2009 for a unique gas-operated reloading gun which is titled in the patent grant as "Magnetic gyro-projectile device with electronic combustion, turbogeneration and gyro stabilization" and for a railgun. In 2007, the Office of Naval Research of the United States Navy showed interest in his railgun technology. He was issued another significant patent in 2007 for a 3D computer mouse. He has a patent for a high torque electric motor also. His last patent, obtained in 2013, is for gravity modulation and its reception where he has claimed to have demonstrated a gravitational wave based communication link. 
He started as a self-taught electronics designer who used to do freelance projects for companies such as Maruti Udyog, Honda, the National Institute for the Visually Handicapped, Dehradun, and Duracell (now a part of Global Gillette). Afterwards, he turned his attention to inventions. His concept for a personal mobility vehicle (PMV) for the common man, a diwheel vehicle, did not go beyond prototype development stage as Pal failed to get companies interested.

Pal is not a qualified designer or engineer. After dropping out of college in 1982, he took to prototyping in electronics, which was his hobby when he was in Gorakhpur living with his late mother (she died in 1982). He designed a DXing radio receiver when he was 14, which never worked; however, he designed his own circuit and made all the PCBs himself. He did freelance projects for Maruti and Honda Power. In 2000, Honda Power product's engineering department in Uttarakhand had designed a charging genset with a technical flaw. So, the Indian Army didn't give the genset clearance. Pal designed an SMPS based voltage regulator for the genset, after which it was accepted by the army.

Pal also takes positions as an environmentalist on the issues of saving trees in Delhi and in that regard seems to have come under various threats from an anti-tree lobby.

Patents
  for an "Arrangement for using induction motor as a sensor to sense its own rotation when electrical power is not being supplied to it"
  for an "Electric motor vehicle with passenger opening through ring motor"
  for an "Optoelectronic encoder with three-dimensional scales"
  for a "Multipurpose motor vehicle with two coaxial parallel wheels and more electromagnetic holonomic wheels in tandem"
  for a "Relaying piston multiuse valve-less electromagnetically controlled energy conversion devices"
  for a "Magnetic gyro-projectile device with electronic combustion, turbogeneration and gyro stabilization"
  for a "Surface flow diverting and static charging ducted pores on wing or blade tip to reduce wake and BVI noise"
  for a "Stacked rail stator and capacitive armature linear motor "
  for a "High power-density static-field ac conduction motor"
  for a "Gravity modulator and gravity-modulation reception "

See also
 Gravitational wave

References

External links
 Gravitational Modulation Facebook page
 Anadish Pal
 EV World article, written by Anadish Pal
 Description of his PMV, written by Anadish Pal
 Indyvation article, Indian Automotive Inventor Anadish Pal's Patents 
 A letter in The Telegraph by Santanu Ganguly, Malda
 An article in The Indian Star by the editor
 A Delhigreens article by Govind Singh
 A news report in The Hindu
 A story in Hindustan Times by Manoj Sharma

20th-century Indian inventors
Indian environmentalists
Bengali scientists
Living people
1963 births
Scientists from Delhi
Indian patent holders
21st-century Indian inventors